The Last Jim is the second album with English lyrics by Danish rock band Gasolin'. It was released in some Western European countries in November 1974 on CBS, simultaneously to its Danish counterpart Stakkels Jim. The songs are identical on the two albums, except for the lyrics. Like on their previous album Gasolin' of the same year, American Leonard "Skip" Malone, helped the band translate the Danish lyrics into English.

All songs are Gasolin' originals, except "Blood Brothers" which is their interpretation of Robert Burns' 18th century poem "Auld Lang Syne".

Track listing

Side one 
"Mrs. Boogie Woogie" (Kim Larsen) – 3:40
"Little Pasha Honeysuckle Divine" (Gasolin' / Gasolin', Skip Malone) – 3:13
"Bingo" (Larsen / Gasolin', Malone) – 3:04
"Boogaloo" (Wili Jønsson, Franz Beckerlee / Gasolin', Malone) – 3:03
"Cellophane Brain" (Gasolin' / Gasolin', Malone) – 6:03

Side two 
"Deadline" (Gasolin' / Gasolin', Malone) – 3:25
"Where Do We Go From Here" (Larsen / Gasolin', Malone) – 2:36
"Fool Of The Night" (Larsen / Gasolin', Malone) – 3:15
"Anna Lee" (Gasolin' / Gasolin', Malone) – 3:11
"Blood Brothers" (Trad: Arr. Gasolin' / Gasolin', Malone) – 4:27
"The Last Jim" (Larsen, Beckerlee) – 2:55

Personnel

Gasolin'
 Kim Larsen – vocals, rhythm guitar, moog
 Franz Beckerlee – lead guitar, moog, harmonica, vocals
 Wili Jønsson – bass, keyboards, vocals, harmonium
 Søren Berlev – drums, percussion, vocals

Additional musicians
 Steen Vig - soprano saxophone, tenor saxophone
 Hugo Rasmussen - double bass
 Palle Mikkelborg - string arrangements

Production
 Roy Thomas Baker – producer
 Freddy Hansson – engineer

Release history

Notes 

Gasolin' albums
1974 albums
Albums produced by Roy Thomas Baker